José Jesús Vázquez González (born 4 April 1977) is a Mexican politician affiliated with the National Action Party. As of 2014 he served as Deputy of the LIX Legislature of the Mexican Congress representing Veracruz.

References

1977 births
Living people
Politicians from Veracruz
National Action Party (Mexico) politicians
Deputies of the LIX Legislature of Mexico
Members of the Chamber of Deputies (Mexico) for Veracruz